Serge Tremblay (born  in La Malbaie) is a Canadian male weightlifter, competing in the 85 kg category and representing Canada at international competitions. He participated at the 1996 Summer Olympics in the 83 kg event. He competed at world championships, most recently at the 2007 World Weightlifting Championships.

Major results

References

External links
 

1973 births
Living people
Canadian male weightlifters
Weightlifters at the 1996 Summer Olympics
Olympic weightlifters of Canada
Commonwealth Games medallists in weightlifting
Commonwealth Games silver medallists for Canada
Commonwealth Games bronze medallists for Canada
Weightlifters at the 1994 Commonwealth Games
20th-century Canadian people
21st-century Canadian people
Medallists at the 1994 Commonwealth Games